The following is a chronological list of notable heads of governments and heads of state deaths that have resulted from assassination or execution.

This list considers only the incumbent head of state or government. Heads of state or government assassinated or executed after they left office (e.g. Aldo Moro and Shinzo Abe) are excluded.

List

Statistics

Gallery

See also
List of assassinations
List of heads of state and government who survived assassination attempts
List of people who survived assassination attempts

References 

 
 
Assassinated
heads